Shaun Richard Commerford (born 24 March 1981) is a former Zimbabwean cricketer. A right-handed batsman and right-arm fast-medium bowler, he played three first-class matches for Matabeleland during the 1999–2000 Logan Cup.

References

External links
 
 

1981 births
Living people
Cricketers from Bulawayo
Matabeleland cricketers
Zimbabwean cricketers